The Union List of Israel (ULI), or Israel Union Catalog, is the union catalog in Israel containing over 5 million bibliographic records. The participating institutions include libraries of Israeli universities and colleges as well as the  National Library of Israel and several major libraries.  Records are in MARC 21 international standard format.
Searching the ULI, you will be able to locate resources in all the main academic institutions in Israel.

References

External links

Library cataloging and classification
Libraries in Israel
National Library of Israel